Sicista concolor, the Chinese birch mouse, is a species of rodent in the family Sminthidae. It is native to China, India and Pakistan.

References

Sicista